The Hunter is the sixth studio album by American rock band Blondie, released on May 24, 1982, by Chrysalis Records. It was Blondie's last album of new material until 1999's  It was recorded in December 1981.

Background
The Hunter, as stated in the press release, is loosely a concept album based on the theme of "searching, hunting, or pursuing one's own Mt. Everest." Tracks on the album include Jimmy Destri's Motown pastiche "Danceway", while "Dragonfly" has a science-fiction theme to its lyrics about a race in space. "The Beast" deals with lead singer Debbie Harry's experiences of becoming a public figure: "I am the centre of attraction, by staying off the streets". "English Boys" is Harry and Chris Stein's melancholy tribute to "those English boys who had long hair", the Beatles, recorded the year after John Lennon's assassination in New York City, describing the innocence and idealism of the 1960s. "War Child" references military conflicts in Cambodia and the Middle East. The album concludes with a cover version of Smokey Robinson's "The Hunter Gets Captured by the Game", originally recorded by the Marvelettes in 1967.

The song "For Your Eyes Only" was originally written for the 1981 James Bond film of the same name. The producers of the film, however, favored a track composed by Bill Conti and Michael Leeson and asked Blondie to record that song instead. When Blondie declined, the Conti/Leeson song was passed on to Sheena Easton. Blondie opted to release their song (written by Harry and Stein) on The Hunter.

Two singles were released from the album, "Island of Lost Souls" and "War Child" (the latter of which was also released as a 12″ extended version). "Danceaway" was planned for release as a single in Canada (backed with "For Your Eyes Only"), but was issued only extremely briefly before the single was withdrawn. Videos for "Island of Lost Souls" and "English Boys" were produced.

In the liner notes to the 2001 reissue of The Hunter, producer Mike Chapman stated, "I knew that we were in a different and far less accessible artistic space. And that worried me. I could tell that things were different now, and I knew that this would be the last Blondie album."

Release and reception

Compared to Blondie's three previous albums with Mike Chapman as producer (Parallel Lines, Eat to the Beat and Autoamerican), The Hunter proved to be a disappointment, both commercially and critically. Six months after its release, the band splintered. The summer Tracks Across America Tour '82 was set to promote the album but turned out to be unsuccessful. The band's European tour which was due to follow in autumn was cancelled.

The Hunter was digitally remastered and reissued by Chrysalis Records UK in 1994, and again by EMI-Capitol in 2001, both times with the 12″ version of "War Child" as the only bonus track.

Track listing

Personnel
Credits adapted from the liner notes of The Hunter.

Blondie
 Clem Burke drums
 Jimmy Destri keyboards
 Nigel Harrison bass
 Debbie Harry vocals
 Frank Infante guitar
 Chris Stein guitar

Additional personnel

 Robert Aaron horn arrangements, saxophone
 Sammy Figueroa percussion
 Manual Badrena percussion
 Roger Squitero percussion
 Janice G. Pendarvis back-up vocals on "The Hunter Gets Captured by the Game"
 Zachary Sanders back-up vocals on "The Hunter Gets Captured by the Game"
 Lani Groves back-up vocals on "The Hunter Gets Captured by the Game"
 Darryl Tookes back-up vocals on "The Hunter Gets Captured by the Game"
 Ray Maldonado horns on "Little Caesar", "Island of Lost Souls" and "War Child"
 Luis Ortiz horns on "Little Caesar", "Island of Lost Souls" and "War Child"
 Richard A. Davies horns on "Little Caesar", "Island of Lost Souls" and "War Child"
 Mac Gollehon horns on "Little Caesar", "Island of Lost Souls" and "War Child"

Technical
 Mike Chapman production
 Doug Schwartz engineering
 Merwin Belin – group production liaison
 Markie Iannello technician
 Kevin Flaherty production (2001 reissue)

Artwork
 Brian Aris photography
 Richard Raynis cover illustration
 Bruce Carleton lettering, back cover illustration
 John Holmstrom lettering
 Janet Levinson design

Charts

Weekly charts

Year-end charts

Certifications

References

Bibliography

 

1982 albums
Albums produced by Mike Chapman
Blondie (band) albums
Chrysalis Records albums
Concept albums